The Carbury–Goodlands Border Crossing connects the towns of Souris, North Dakota and Deloraine, Manitoba on the Canada–United States border. North Dakota Highway 14 on the American side joins Manitoba Highway 21 on the Canadian side.

Canadian side
Deloraine, which had a customs presence from 1889, served as the frontier office. In 1932, the function was moved to the border, adopting the name of Goodlands, the nearest post office. That year, a residence and office accommodation were erected. Canada replaced the 1970s-era Goodlands border station in 2014. In 2020, the former border hours of 8am–10pm reduced, becoming 9am–5pm.

US side
The settlement of Carbury, North Dakota has virtually vanished. The border station built in 1963 was replaced in 2011. The border was previously open until 10 pm.

See also
 List of Canada–United States border crossings

References

Canada–United States border crossings
1932 establishments in Manitoba
1932 establishments in North Dakota
Buildings and structures in Bottineau County, North Dakota